OpenNet may refer to the following:
OpenNet, the original name for B92.net, the Internet division of Serbian radio and television broadcaster B92; see 
OpenNet, a sensitive but unclassified network that supports e-mail and data applications of the U.S. State Department domestically and abroad; see 
OpenNet Initiative, a joint project with the goal of monitoring and reporting internet filtering and surveillance practices by nations
OpenNet Singapore, a joint venture of four companies building a national broadband network; see 
OpenNet (website), a Russian news site about free and open-source software
OpenNet (organization), a South Korean Non-governmental organization 
OpenNet (ISP), a Cambodian ISP that shut down operations in February 2022.